The Hotel Chadron, at 115 Main St. in Chadron, Nebraska, was built in 1890 in Italianate style.  It has also been known as the Railroad YMCA and as the Olde Main Street Inn.  It was listed on the National Register of Historic Places in 2002.

The hotel opened August 8, 1890, as a replacement for a previous hotel that burned. It served as the headquarters for investigating general Nelson A. Miles while he investigated the Wounded Knee Massacre of December 29, 1890.  Miles came to the Chadron Hotel immediately, arriving December 30, and within weeks identified "blind stupidity or criminal indifference" as contributing causes of the tragedy.  It is unclear how long he stayed at the hotel.

References

External links 
More photos of the Hotel Chadron at Wikimedia Commons

Hotel buildings on the National Register of Historic Places in Nebraska
Hotel Chadron
Hotel buildings completed in 1890
Hotel Chadron
Hotels in Nebraska
Hotels established in 1890
National Register of Historic Places in Dawes County, Nebraska